The Kissimmee Historic District is a U.S. historic district (designated as such on January 4, 1994) located in Kissimmee, Florida. The district is bounded by Aultman Street, Monument Avenue, Penfield Street and Randolph Avenue. It contains 189 historic buildings.

References

External links

 Osceola County listings at National Register of Historic Places

Geography of Osceola County, Florida
Historic districts on the National Register of Historic Places in Florida
Kissimmee, Florida
National Register of Historic Places in Osceola County, Florida
1994 establishments in Florida